Lala, officially the Municipality of Lala, is a 1st class municipality in the province of Lanao del Norte, Philippines. According to the 2020 census, it has a population of 73,425 people.

The town is famous for its specialized crab dishes and its Alimango festival, which is dedicated to its crab produce.

History
Lala was created from Tubod through Executive Order No. 208 signed by President Elpidio Quirino on March 22, 1949.

Geography
The Municipality of Lala is geographically situated in a vast plain within the Kapatagan Valley, with the area of  along the coast of Panguil Bay. It is geographically bounded on the north-west by Panguil Bay, on the north-east by the municipality of Baroy, on the south by the municipality of Kapatagan and on the east by the municipality of Salvador.

Barangays
Lala is politically subdivided into 27 barangays.

Climate

Demographics

Economy

The economy in Lala is based mostly on agriculture and fishery-based type. Its main crops are rice, corn, coconut, and kalamansi (Philippine Lime). It likewise produces fishery products from marine fishing and fishpond operation in the coastal barangays along the Panguil Bay area.

Most of the commercial and educational establishments are located in Barangay Maranding, which is now becoming the growing center of trade, commerce, and education in the western portion of Lanao del Norte. It is also the highest income-generating municipality in the province.

References

External links

 Lala Profile at the DTI Cities and Municipalities Competitive Index
 [ Philippine Standard Geographic Code]
Philippine Census Information
 
Local Governance Performance Management System

Municipalities of Lanao del Norte
Establishments by Philippine executive order